YS MegaBasic is a BASIC programming language interpreter for the 1982 Sinclair Research ZX Spectrum microcomputer, written by Mike Leaman. The interpreter was available by mail-order from Your Spectrum magazine, hence the name "YS MegaBasic".

When loaded it left the user 22K of usable memory. YS MegaBasic allowed keywords to be spelled out letter-for-letter, which was quicker if the user had fitted a full-size full-travel keyboard to their machine, a very popular modification for serious users. This also removed the necessity for memorising the sometimes arcane key combinations necessary to enter less-commonly-used Sinclair BASIC keywords. It also featured three different font sizes, user definable keys, copy-and-paste, a Sinclair QL-like windowing system, sprites and sound effects.

New commands added by YS MegaBasic:

Releases
YSMegaBasic V1.0 - 1984
YSMegaBasic V1.1 - 1984
YSMegaBasic V1.1 Sprite Designer - 1984
YSMegaBasic V3.0 - 1985
YSMegaBasic V4.0 - 1985

References 

BASIC extensions
ZX Spectrum software
BASIC interpreters
BASIC programming language family